Out in the Storm is the fourth studio album by Katie Crutchfield's band Waxahatchee, released on July 14, 2017 through Merge. It features her sister Allison Crutchfield on keyboards and percussion, as well as Katie Harkin (the touring guitarist for Sleater-Kinney), Katherine Simonetti, and Ashley Arnwine. Dinosaur Jr./Sonic Youth producer John Agnello recorded the album live. The album was released digitally, on vinyl and compact disc.

Reception

Out in the Storm gained a positive reception from music critics. At Metacritic, which assigns a normalized rating out of 100 to reviews from mainstream critics, the album received an average score of 80 based on 28 reviews, indicating "generally favorable reviews". In AllMusic, Marcy Donelson wrote: "With Crutchfield forthright as ever and collaborators suited to drive home her position, Out in the Storm hits with strength as much as emotion." Exclaim! writer Sarah Murphy remarked that "the results are some of Crutchfield's biggest rock'n'roll anthems yet."

Accolades

Track listing

Personnel
Adapted from AllMusic.

 John Agnello – engineer, producer
 Ashley Arnwine – drums
 Greg Calbi – mastering
 Allison Crutchfield – keyboards, percussion
 Katie Crutchfield – bass, guitar, keyboards, percussion, producer, vocals
 Joey Doubek – percussion
 Katie Harkin – guitar, keyboards, percussion, piano, vocals
 Daniel Murphy – design
 Matt Schimelfenig – Tracking assistant
 Daniel Shea – photography
 Katherine Simonetti – bass

References

2017 albums
Waxahatchee albums
Merge Records albums
Albums produced by John Agnello